Scotinotylus protervus is a species of sheet weaver found in Alaska, Canada, Kazakhstan, Mongolia and Russia. It was described by L. Koch in 1879.

References

Linyphiidae
Spiders of Asia
Spiders of North America
Spiders described in 1879